Hansine Lund (1817 – after 1896) was a Norwegian (originally Danish) stage actor.   She was a leading actress first in the company of Jacob Mayson and then for Gustav Wilhelm Selmer at the Trøndelag Teater in a period when there professional theatre in Norway, outside of Oslo, consisted of travelling Danish theatre companies and few actors became known other than temporarily.

References

1817 births
19th-century Danish actresses
Danish stage actresses
19th-century Norwegian actresses
Norwegian stage actresses
Year of death missing